Caroline Williams is an American actress and producer. She is best known for her role as Stretch in The Texas Chainsaw Massacre film series. Her other film roles include Alamo Bay (1985), The Legend of Billie Jean (1985), Stepfather II (1989), Days of Thunder (1990), Leprechaun 3 (1995), How the Grinch Stole Christmas (2000), Halloween II (2009), and Hatchet 3 (2013). Williams has made guest appearances on several television series such as Hunter (1987), Murder, She Wrote (1992), ER (1996), Suddenly Susan (1996), Sabrina, the Teenage Witch (1997), The District (2003), and Grey's Anatomy (2010).

Life and career
Williams made her film debut in the 1975 film Smile. A decade later, she starred in Alamo Bay and The Legend of Billie Jean. In 1986, Williams had small roles in Thompson's Last Run and Getting Even before portraying Vanita "Stretch" Brock in The Texas Chainsaw Massacre 2. In 1989, Williams starred in Stepfather 2.

In 1990, she reprised her role as Stretch for a brief cameo in the film Leatherface: The Texas Chainsaw Massacre III and also starred in Days of Thunder.

In 1995, Williams starred in Leprechaun 3. From the mid to late 1990s, Williams had guest appearances on several television series such as ER (1996), Suddenly Susan (1996) and Sabrina, the Teenage Witch (1997).

In 2000, Williams had a small role in How the Grinch Stole Christmas. She made a return to horror films in 2009 with a role in Rob Zombie's Halloween II and had a guest appearance on Grey's Anatomy the following year. In 2013, Williams starred in the horror films Contracted and Hatchet III. Other appearances include Martian Land (2015), Blood Feast (2016) and Fantasma (2017).

Filmography

References

External links

Audio interview with Caroline Williams about 'The Unleashed'
Interview with Caroline Williams for Kitley's Krypt 

American film actresses
American television actresses
Living people
Actresses from Texas
20th-century American actresses
21st-century American actresses
People from Rusk, Texas
Year of birth missing (living people)